Farm to Market Roads in Texas are owned and maintained by the Texas Department of Transportation (TxDOT).

FM 3000

Farm to Market Road 3000 (FM 3000) is located in Bastrop County. It begins in Elgin, at an intersection with Loop 109. It runs east approximately  before state maintenance ends. The roadway continues as Old Lexington Road, which, along with Willow Road and CR 1202, provides access to FM 696 at the Lee County line.

Farm to Market Road 3000 was designated on May 5, 1966.

FM 3001

Farm to Market Road 3001 (FM 3001) is located in Harrison and Marion counties.

FM 3002

Farm to Market Road 3002 (FM 3002) is located in southern Cooke County. The highway is signed as Lone Oak Road. It was designated on November 16, 1981, along its current route.

FM 3002 begins at Interstate 35 and continues eastward.  The road crosses two arms of Lake Ray Roberts.  Shortly after where it passes the entrance to the Johnson Branch Unit of Lake Ray Roberts State Park, the road changes direction to northeastward. FM 3002 ends at an intersection with FM 372; the road itself continues northward as FM 372 (the southern stretch of FM 372 branches off at this point).

Junction list

FM 3002 (1965)

The original FM 3002 was designated on June 1, 1965, from I-45, 2.6 miles south of FM 518, northeast to FM 1266. On December 18, 1979, the road was extended east to FM 517 (now FM 3436). FM 3002 was cancelled on April 15, 1980, and transferred to FM 646.

FM 3003

Farm to Market Road 3003 (FM 3003) is located in Young County.

FM 3004

Farm to Market Road 3004 (FM 3004) is located in Lipscomb County.

FM 3005

Farm to Market Road 3005 (FM 3005) is located in Galveston County. FM 3005 has a western terminus at the approach to the toll bridge over San Luis Pass; the bridge connects to the Bluewater Highway (County Road 257) on the Brazoria County side. It travels to the northeast along Termini–San Luis Pass Road, through Galveston (and briefly Jamaica Beach), crossing Galveston Island State Park. It passes Scholes International Airport before entering the Galveston central business district. Beginning near Cove View Boulevard, the route is signed as Seawall Boulevard, as it runs alongside the Galveston Seawall. The FM 3005 designation ends at Spur 342 (61st Street), which provides access to I-45. Seawall Boulevard continues under county maintenance to SH 87 on the eastern side of the island.

FM 3005 was first designated in Galveston County on March 31, 1966; its western terminus was at 13 Mile Road. The route was lengthened to the boundary of Galveston Island State Park on February 1, 1972, and through the park and to the San Luis Pass Toll Bridge on February 24, 1988. The designation was changed to Urban Road 3005 (UR 3005) on June 27, 1995. The designation reverted to FM 3005 with the elimination of the Urban Road system on November 15, 2018.

Junction list

FM 3006

Farm to Market Road 3006 (FM 3006) is located in Atascosa County.

FM 3007

Farm to Market Road 3007 (FM 3007) is located in Franklin County.

FM 3007 (1966)

FM 3007 was first designated on May 5, 1966, running from FM 484 to Cranes Mill Road. On June 12, 1967, this FM 3007 was cancelled and combined with FM 306.

RM 3008

Ranch to Market Road 3008 (RM 3008) is located in Kinney County.

FM 3009

Farm to Market Road 3009 (FM 3009) is located in Comal and Guadalupe counties. The southern terminus of FM 3009 is in Schertz, at an intersection with FM 78. The route travels in a generally northwesterly direction along four-lane Roy Richard Drive, one of the major north–south thoroughfares in Schertz. FM 3009 crosses IH 35 at its exit 175; past this point, the road is known as Natural Bridge Caverns Road. The route enters Garden Ridge, where it crosses FM 2252 and becomes a two-lane road. Outside of Garden Ridge, FM 3009 passes Natural Bridge Caverns and doglegs to the northeast before meeting FM 1863 in the outskirts of Bulverde. FM 3009 continues north through unincorporated Comal County before ending at a junction with SH 46.

FM 3009 was designated on May 5, 1966; the original route was the section in Schertz, from FM 78 to IH 35. The portion from FM 2252 to FM 78 was redesignated as Urban Road 3009 (UR 3009) on June 27, 1995. The designation of this section reverted to FM 3009 with the elimination of the Urban Road System on November 15, 2018.

Junction list

FM 3010

Farm to Market Road 3010 (FM 3010) is located in DeWitt County.

FM 3011

Farm to Market Road 3011 (FM 3011) is located in Fayette County.

FM 3012

Farm to Market Road 3012 (FM 3012) is located in Wharton County.

FM 3013

Farm to Market Road 3013 (FM 3013) is located in Wharton, Colorado and Austin counties. It runs from FM 102 north and northeast via Eagle Lake to SH 36.

FM 3013 was designated on February 29, 1968, from I-10 at Sealy southwest  to FM 1093 at Eagle Lake. On January 25, 1971, the road was extended southwest to US 90A at Eagle Lake, replacing a section of FM 1093. The final change was on September 9, 1973, when the road was extended south 6.4 miles to FM 102.

FM 3013 (1966)

FM 3013 was previously designated on May 5, 1966. The highway ran from FM 1822 (this section is now part of FM 3131) to FM 1593 near Lolita. On January 16, 1968, this FM 3013 was deleted from the highway system due to construction of Lake Texana. In exchange, the then-new FM 3131 was created.

RM 3014

Ranch to Market Road 3014 (RM 3014) is located in Llano County.

FM 3015

Farm to Market Road 3015 (FM 3015) was located in Austin. The highway was designated on May 5, 1966. On July 11, 1986, FM 3015 was cancelled with maintenance being turned over to the city of Austin.

No highway currently uses the FM 3015 designation.

FM 3016

FM 3017

FM 3018

FM 3019

FM 3020

Farm to Market Road 3020 (FM 3020) is located in Lubbock County.

FM 3020 begins at an intersection with Spur 331 near US 84 in southeastern Lubbock. The highway travels in an eastern direction, passes near a large livestock area and the Jones Station Power Plant, then ends at an intersection with FM 835 near Buffalo Springs.

The current FM 3020 was designated on November 26, 1969, along its current route when a section of County Road 7100 was upgraded.

FM 3020 (1966)

FM 3020 was designated on May 5, 1966, from FM 903 eastward to US 69. The highway was cancelled on September 3, 1968, and combined with FM 2194.

FM 3021

FM 3022

FM 3023

FM 3024

FM 3024 (1966)

FM 3024 was previously designated on May 5, 1966, from FM 769 east to SH 214. On May 7, 1970, the road was extended east to FM 1780. Eleven days later, FM 3024 was cancelled with the mileage being transferred to FM 1585.

FM 3025

FM 3026

FM 3026 (1966)

FM 3026 was first designated on May 5, 1966. The highway ran from FM 1190 (now FM 167) eastward  to near Falls Creek. On November 26, 1969, FM 3026 was cancelled with the mileage being transferred to FM 1192 (later FM 208, now FM 4).

FM 3027

FM 3028

FM 3029

Farm to Market Road 3029 (FM 3029) is located in Hurst and North Richland Hills, just northeast of Fort Worth, in Tarrant County. It is known locally as Precinct Line Road.

FM 3029 begins at SH 121/SH 183 (Airport Freeway) in Hurst; the Precinct Line Road name continues south of here. After an intersection with Harwood Road, the highway passes along the eastern edge of the northeast campus of Tarrant County College. After crossing SH 26 (Grapevine Highway), FM 3029 runs along the city line between North Richland Hills and Hurst. Near the intersection with Mid-Cities Boulevard, the highway passes by the Birdville ISD administration building and Birdville High School. After the intersection witGlade Road, FM 3029 crosses over the Cotton Belt Trail, the Trinity Metro commuter train route, TEXRail, and sees less development along its route. Just north of here, FM 3029 runs along the city line between North Richland Hills and Colleyville. FM 3029 ends at an intersection with FM 1938 near Keller.

FM 3029 was designated on May 5, 1966, along its current route. On June 27, 1995, the entire route was redesignated Urban Road 3029 (UR 3029). The designation reverted to FM 3029 with the elimination of the Urban Road system on November 15, 2018.

Junction list

FM 3030

FM 3031

FM 3032

FM 3033

FM 3034

Farm to Market Road 3034 (FM 3034) is located in Jones County. It runs from US 83/US 277 eastward to FM 600 in Abilene near Lake Fort Phantom Hill.

FM 3034 was designated on May 5, 1966, along the current route. On June 27, 1995, the entire route was redesignated Urban Road 3034 (UR 3034). The designation reverted to FM 3034 with the elimination of the Urban Road system on November 15, 2018.

FM 3035

FM 3036

FM 3037

FM 3038

Farm to Market Road 3038 (FM 3038) was located in McKinney and traveled along Virginia Parkway. On August 25, 2016, FM 3038 was cancelled and turned over to the city of McKinney.

No highway currently uses the FM 3038 designation.

FM 3039

Farm to Market Road 3039 (FM 3039) is located in Kaufman County.

FM 3039 begins at an intersection with FM 1389 in Combine. The highway travels in a northeast direction and passes near a residential area, leaving the town near the East Fork Trinity River. FM 3039 continues to travel in a northeast direction and passes through rural areas, entering Crandall near Crandall High School. In Crandall, the highway is known as Lewis Street and runs in a more eastern direction, ending at an intersection with FM 148.

The highway was extended  to FM 1389 on July 11, 1968.

FM 3040

Farm to Market Road 3040 (FM 3040) runs  from Flower Mound to Lewisville in Denton County. FM 3040 begins at the intersection of FM 2499 and Flower Mound Road in Flower Mound. It travels eastward along Flower Mound Road, passing near the town's namesake, into Lewisville, where it is known as Round Grove Road. It crosses Business SH 121 and passes Vista Ridge Mall before ending at I-35E exit 448B.

FM 3040 was designated on May 5, 1966, from FM 2499 eastward to SH 121 (now Business SH 121) in Lewisville. It was extended to I-35E on June 2, 1967. On June 27, 1995, the entire route was redesignated Urban Road 3040 (UR 3040). The designation reverted to FM 3040 with the elimination of the Urban Road system on November 15, 2018.

Junction list

FM 3041

FM 3042

FM 3043

Farm to Market Road 3043 (FM 3043) is located in Montague County. FM 3043 begins at US 81 in Bowie. The route runs to the northeast along Pelham Street, past Pelham Park, before turning to the southeast along East Nelson Street. It leaves Bowie and enters the farming areas east of the city along Brushy Creek. State maintenance and the FM 3043 designation end near the intersection of Orchard and Lama Roads.

FM 3043 was designated along its current route on May 5, 1966, from US 287 (then concurrent with US 81) in Bowie to its current southern terminus. As US 287 was moved to a freeway west of the city in 1980, FM 3043 no longer intersects that route.

FM 3044

FM 3045

FM 3046

FM 3047

FM 3048

FM 3048 (1966)

FM 3048 was originally designated on May 5, 1966, running from FM 219 to the Hamilton–Comanche county line. On December 29, 1975, the highway was cancelled and combined with FM 2823.

FM 3049

FM 3050

FM 3051

Farm to Market Road 3051 (FM 3051) is located in McLennan County.

FM 3051 begins at the entrance to Waco Regional Airport in Waco. The highway travels in an eastern direction, interacting FM 1637, and continuing along Steinbeck Bend Drive through the Bosqueville neighborhood, passing the Waco Mammoth National Monument. At M.L.K. Jr. Boulevard, FM 3051 turns right onto Lake Shore Drive. The highway runs parallel to the Brazos River before crossing the river and intersecting FM 933. Just east of FM 933, FM 3051 enters the town of Lacy Lakeview where it is known as Industrial Boulevard. The highway ends at Bus. US 77 and Loop 340.

FM 3051 was designated on May 5, 1966, replacing the FM 933 spur connection from US 81 (this section became Loop 491 on October 2, 1970, now Bus. US 77) to FM 933, and continued on a new alignment to FM 1637. On June 11, 1968, FM 3051 was extended southwest to the Waco Regional Airport, completing its current route. On June 27, 1995, the entire route was redesignated Urban Road 3051 (UR 3051). The designation reverted to FM 3051 with the elimination of the Urban Road system on November 15, 2018.

Junction list

FM 3052

Farm to Market Road 3052 (FM 3052) is located in north-central Cherokee County. It begins at FM 177 in Mixon and runs northward approximately  through unincorporated Cherokee County before state maintenance ends at the Smith County line. The roadway continues as Mixon Road under Smith County jurisdiction.

FM 3052 was designated on June 10, 1966, along the current route.

FM 3053

Farm to Market Road 3053 (FM 3053) is located in Rusk and Gregg counties. It runs from FM 850 in Overton north to I-20 in Liberty City.

FM 3053 was designated on May 5, 1966, from I-20 to FM 1639. On January 31, 1972, the highway extended south to FM 850, replacing a section of FM 1639.
Junction list

RM 3054

FM 3055

FM 3056

FM 3057

FM 3058

FM 3059

FM 3060

FM 3061

FM 3062

FM 3062 (1966)

FM 3062 was first designated on May 5, 1966, running from FM 109 to FM 332. On June 2, 1967, the highway was cancelled and removed from the highway system. It was never built.

FM 3063

FM 3064

FM 3064 (1966)

FM 3064 was first designated on May 5, 1966, running from FM 834 north  to a road intersection. On June 2, 1967, the highway was extended northward to FM 162. On July 11, 1968, FM 3064 was cancelled and removed from the highway system in exchange for extending FM 2090.

FM 3065

FM 3066

FM 3067

FM 3068

Farm to Market Road 3068 (FM 3068) is located in southern Cameron County. FM 3068 travels north along Indiana Avenue and enters Brownsville to its northern terminus at FM 511, which continues to the north along Indiana Avenue and to the west along Dockberry Road.

FM 3068 was designated on May 5, 1966, along the current route.

FM 3069

FM 3070

Farm to Market Road 3070 (FM 3070) was designated on August 1, 1966, running from FM 1547 to a road intersection. On July 11, 1968, the highway was extended  to the south and west. On November 26, 1969, the highway was extended  to the north. On May 30, 1974, FM 3070 was cancelled and combined with FM 3143.

No highway currently uses the FM 3070 designation.

FM 3071

FM 3072

Farm to Market Road 3072 (FM 3072) is located in southern Hidalgo County.

FM 3072 begins at an intersection with FM 2061 in Pharr. The highway runs east along Dicker Drive through town, where it intersects US 281. FM 3072 continues to run east, exiting the town just after US 281 and enters into San Juan, where it intersects FM 2557. The highway ends at an intersection with FM 907 south of Alamo.

FM 3072 was designated on May 5, 1966, along its current route. On June 27, 1995, the entire route was redesignated Urban Road 3072 (UR 3072). The designation reverted to FM 3072 with the elimination of the Urban Road system on November 15, 2018.

Junction list

FM 3073

FM 3074

FM 3075

FM 3076

FM 3077

FM 3078

Farm to Market Road 3078 (FM 3078) is located in Reeves and Jeff Davis counties. A former alignment of US 290, it runs through rural lands between I-10 and SH 17.

RM 3078/FM 3078 (1966–1983)

On April 25, 1978, the road was extended northeast  and renamed FM 3078. On January 23, 1980, the road was extended northeast  to FM 481 at the Zavala–Uvalde county line. FM 3078 was cancelled on July 8, 1983, and transferred to FM 481.

FM 3079

FM 3080

FM 3081

FM 3082

FM 3083

Farm to Market Road 3083 (FM 3083) is located in Montgomery County.

FM 3083 begins at an intersection with Farm to Market Road 1485/Old Houston Road southeast of Grangerland. The highway passes through Grangerland where it intersects with Farm to Market Road 2090. FM 3083 enters the city limits of Conroe right before intersecting with Loop 336. Inside the loop, the highway runs through largely undeveloped areas of the town's eastern side. North of Loop 336, FM 3083 turns to the west and starts to see a little more development along its route until an intersection with Farm to Market Road 1484. FM 3083 passes near a major retail area between SH 75 and Interstate 45. The highway passes over the interstate on the Don Blanton Memorial Bridge and runs near many residential areas before ending at SH 105 in northwestern Conroe.

FM 3083 was designated on June 2, 1967, from SH 105 east of Conroe southeast to FM 1485. On February 26, 1986, FM 3083 was extended west to I-45. On February 26, 1998, FM 3083 was extended northwest to SH 105, completing its current route.

Junction list

FM 3084

FM 3085

FM 3086

FM 3087

FM 3088

FM 3089

FM 3090

Farm to Market Road 3090 (FM 3090) is located in Grimes County. It runs from FM 244 south of Carlos to Business SH 6-S in Navasota.

FM 3090 was designated on June 2, 1967, from FM 244, 2.5 miles southeast of Carlos, southeast  to SH 90 near Anderson. On October 8, 1970, the route was transferred to FM 244 while FM 3090 was rerouted along the former route of FM 244 to SH 6 (later Loop 508, now Business SH 6-S) in Navasota.

FM 3091

FM 3092

FM 3092 (1967)

FM 3092 was first designated on June 2, 1967, running from SH 36 southwest  to a road intersection. On December 19, 1969, the highway was cancelled and combined with FM 1948.

RM 3093

Ranch to Market Road 3093 (RM 3093) is located in Glasscock and Reagan counties. It connects SH 137 and RM 33.

RM 3093 begins at an intersection with RM 1357 in unincorporated Glasscock County. The highway runs in a slight northwest direction, turning west at a county road, before turning back in a northwest direction. RM 3093's northern terminus is at an intersection with RM 2401 in unincorporated Reagan County.

RM 3093 was designated on November 25, 1975, on its current route.

FM 3093

A previous route designated Farm to Market Road 3093 (FM 3093) was designated in Collin County on June 2, 1967. FM 3093 was cancelled on May 7, 1974, and was combined with FM 3133.

FM 3094

FM 3095

Farm to Market Road 3095 (FM 3095) is located in Upton and Midland counties.

FM 3095 (1967)

FM 3095 was first designated on June 2, 1967, running from FM 1388 southwest  to the Wilson Chapel Church and Cemetery. On June 7, 1974, the highway was cancelled and combined with FM 2860.

FM 3096

FM 3097

Farm to Market Road 3097 (FM 3097) is located in entirely in Rockwall. The highway was designated on June 2, 1967, along the current route. FM 3097 is known locally as Horizon Road.

FM 3097 begins at an intersection with FM 549. The highway runs northwest, passing by many housing developments until an intersection with Ralph Hall Parkway. After Ralph Hall Parkway, the highway passes by a major retail center before ending at an intersection with FM 740.

FM 3098

Farm to Market Road 3098 (FM 3098) is located in Bowie County.

FM 3099

Farm to Market Road 3099 (FM 3099) is located in Stephens County.

The highway begins at an intersection with FM 2231 in unincorporated Stephens County. FM 3099 runs north before entering Breckenridge, where the highway has a short overlap with US 180. Leaving its concurrency with US 180, FM 3099 continues to run north, passing near Hubbard Creek Reservoir before ending at Hubbard Creek Dam Road near the Hubbard Creek Reservoir Dam. FM 3099 in Breckenridge south of US 180 is known locally as City Pool Road.

FM 3099 was designated on November 25, 1975, from Hubbard Creek Dam Road south to US 180. On October 29, 1992, FM 3099 was extended south to FM 2231.

Junction list

FM 3099 (1967)

FM 3099 was first designated on June 2, 1967. This highway was decommissioned on August 18, 1975, being removed from the highway system.

References

+30
Farm to market roads 3000
Farm to Market Roads 3000